This is a list of flag bearers who have represented Morocco at the Olympics.

Flag bearers carry the national flag of their country at the opening ceremony of the Olympic Games.

See also
Morocco at the Olympics

References

Morocco at the Olympics
Morocco
Olympic flagbearers
Olympic flagbearers